Muni Metro is a light rail system serving San Francisco, California, United States. Operated by the San Francisco Municipal Railway (Muni), a part of the San Francisco Municipal Transportation Agency (SFMTA), Muni Metro served an average of 157,700 passengers per weekday in the fourth quarter of 2019, making it the second-busiest light rail system in the United States. Six services – J Church, K Ingleside, L Taraval, M Ocean View, N Judah, and T Third Street run on separate surface alignments and merge into a single downtown tunnel. The supplementary S Shuttle service operates within the tunnel. Muni Metro operates a fleet of 151 Breda high-floor light rail vehicles (LRVs), which are currently being replaced by a fleet of 249 Siemens S200 LRVs.

The San Francisco Municipal Railway was created in 1909 and opened its first streetcar lines in 1912. Five of the current lines were added in the following decades: the J in 1917, the K (including the Twin Peaks Tunnel) in 1918, the L in 1919, the M in 1925, and the N in 1928. The other Municipal Railway streetcar lines, and those of the privately owned Market Street Railway, were converted to buses in the 1920s to 1950s, but these five lines were retained as streetcars because of their private rights of way. The system was converted to light rail, with larger US Standard Light Rail Vehicles, in the late 1970s and early 1980s. This included the opening of the Market Street subway as well as extension of three lines to Balboa Park station. An extension along The Embarcadero to the Caltrain terminal at 4th and King Street opened in 1998. The T Third Street line opened in 2007, serving the southeastern portion of the city. The Central Subway, with three new subway stations and one new surface station, opened on November 19, 2022.

The system has 113 stations, of which 59 (52%) are accessible. The other 80 stations have a mixture of low-level platforms on dedicated right-of-way, low-level boarding islands (platforms between the tracks and traffic lanes), sidewalk bulbs, and no platforms (where passengers cross parking or traffic lanes to board). Of those 80, 25 have "mini-high" platforms providing accessible boarding at a single door, while one has a wheelchair lift. Three stations on the L Taraval are being retrofitted with mini-high platforms as part of a reconstruction project.

Current stations

Former stations

Prior to the late 1970s, there was a higher density of stops on the surface streetcar lines. Many of these stops were closed as the conversion to Muni Metro introduced longer trains and a desire for higher surface speeds. Most were had no infrastructure other than marked poles at street corners; several on the M Ocean View had small platforms. A number of stops on Market Street were closed when the Market Street subway opened; most are now served by the F Market & Wharves streetcar. Four stations with significant infrastructure were closed during conversion:

Several surface stops have closed during the Muni Metro era during station consolidation projects.

References

External links

 
Muni
Muni Metro
Muni Metro
Muni